Philippe Denis (17 January 1947 in Bordeaux, France – 8 November 2021 in Viana do Castelo in Portugal), was a French poet, essayist, and translator.

Biography 

Philippe Denis authored several books of poetry and essays, as well as translations from both English and Japanese. He had contributed work to numerous French-language journals: L'Éphémère, Argile, Clivages, NRF, Critique, Les Cahiers du Sud, La Revue de Belles-Lettres, Po&sie, Limon, Banana Split, L'Ire des Vents and La Thirteenth. ; as well as internationally: New Direction, Chicago Review, M(odern) P(oetry) in T(ranslation), Origin, Triquarterly Review, Poetry Now, Mundus Artium (United States and Great Britain), Park ( Berlin), Nuovi Argomenti (Rome), Edebiyat Çeviri Dergisi (Ankara).

He was a Fulbright Visiting Lecturer (University of Minnesota) a then Member of the Faculty of Bennington College (Vermont); in addition, Denis had been a lecturer in Turkey at the University of Uludağ (Bursa) and Çukurova (Adana), as well as the university from Coimbra (Portugal).

In 1978 he participated in the International Writing Program at the University of Iowa.

He had lived abroad for more than thirty years.

Translations into French 
 Unearth (poèmes de Paul Auster ; lithographies de J-P. Riopelle), Maeght, 1980
 Poèmes d'Emily Dickinson précédé de Amherst 1980, Le Voleur de talan, 1980
 Notes sur des pivoines, Masaoka Shiki (traduction établie avec le concours de Kanako Yoshida ; l'édition de tête comporte une calligraphie de Noriko Kobayashi), Thierry Bouchard, 1984
 ...au sommet d'une tour arasée, (E. Dickinson, M. Moore, S. Plath et Laura R. Jackson), Passage, 1986
 Quarante-sept poèmes d'Emily Dickinson, La Dogana, 1987
 En Poussière honorée, poèmes d'Emily Dickinson, La Ligne d'ombre, 2013
Cent dix sept poèmes d'Emily Dickinson, La Dogana, 2020

Works translated into English 
 Notebook of shadows (selected poems 1974–1980), translated by Mark Irwin, afterword by Paul Auster, The Globe Press, Cleveland, New York, 1980
Origin, Fourth series, featuring Philippe Denis, Boston, Mass., January 1980
Nugæ, translated by Cid Corman, Longhouse publisher, Green River, Vermont, 2001

References 

1947 births
2021 deaths
20th-century French poets
21st-century French poets
20th-century French translators
21st-century French translators
People from Bordeaux